Sir Walter Denys (c. 1501–1571) was the member of Parliament for Gloucestershire in the Parliament of 1558 and Cricklade in 1559.

References 

Members of the Parliament of England (pre-1707) for Cricklade
Sheriffs in the United Kingdom
Members of the Parliament of England for Gloucestershire
1500s births
1571 deaths
Year of birth uncertain
English MPs 1558
English MPs 1559